Znamenka is a rural locality in Zhigalovsky District of Irkutsk Oblast, Russia. Population:  in 2010 it had 587 inhabitants.

Statesman Ivan Serebrennikov (1882–1953), as well as scientists Boris Mikhailov (1908–1984) and Mikhail Vinokurov (1949–), were born in Znamenka.

Geography
It lies on the left bank of the Ilga river about  ENE of Konstantinovka.

See also
Lena-Angara Plateau

References

External links
  Zhigalovsky District - General Information (in Russian)

Rural localities in Irkutsk Oblast
Zhigalovsky District